Fuzz Universe is the third full length instrumental album and 9th overall by hard rock guitar virtuoso Paul Gilbert.

Track listing
All songs written by Paul Gilbert except where noted:

Notes
 Track 4 originally by J.S. Bach
 Track 5 originally recorded by Todd Rundgren on the album A Cappella (1985)

Personnel
 Paul Gilbert – guitar, vocals
 Tony Spinner – guitar, vocals
 Craig Roberts – bass
 Jeff Bowders – drums
 Emi Gilbert · keyboards
 Cover art by Alejandro Chavetta and James Chiang

References

http://bulletcable.com/paul-gilberts-fuzz-universe-tour-europe-2010/

Paul Gilbert albums
2010 albums
Shrapnel Records albums